Urban was a Danish free daily newspaper owned by Det Berlingske Officin.

History and profile
Urban was launched on 24  September 2001, shortly after the competing free daily MetroXpress (the Danish edition of the Metro newspaper).

In its first year Urban had a circulation 108,000 copies. It was 181,000 copies in 2002 and 171,000 copies in 2003. Urban had a circulation of 330,000 copies both in 2006 and in 2007. The circulation in second half of 2008 was 196,752.

Urban was closed on 12 January 2012.

See also
 List of newspapers in Denmark

References

External links
 Official website

2001 establishments in Denmark
2012 disestablishments in Denmark
Publications established in 2001
Publications disestablished in 2012
Danish-language newspapers
Defunct free daily newspapers
Defunct newspapers published in Denmark
Newspapers published in Copenhagen
Daily newspapers published in Denmark